The 1844 United States presidential election in Michigan took place between November 1 and December 4, 1844, as part of the 1844 United States presidential election. Voters chose five representatives, or electors to the Electoral College, who voted for President and Vice President.

Michigan voted for the Democratic candidate, James K. Polk, over Whig candidate Henry Clay and Liberty candidate James G. Birney. Polk won Michigan by a margin of 6.03%.

With 6.53% of the popular vote, Michigan would prove to be Jame G. Birney's fourth strongest state after New Hampshire, Massachusetts and Vermont.

Results

See also
 United States presidential elections in Michigan

References

Michigan
1844
1844 Michigan elections